Peaer (stylised as peaer) is an American indie rock band from Purchase, New York. Beginning as the project of guitarist and vocalist Peter Katz, Peaer currently consists of Katz, Thom Lombardi and Jeremy Kinney. Peaer has released three full-length albums and was most recently signed to Tiny Engines. Their first album, released in 2014, is titled the eyes sink into the skull. In 2016, Peaer released their self-titled second album. In 2019, Peaer released their third full-length album titled A Healthy Earth.

References

American musical groups
Indie rock musical groups from New York (state)
Slowcore musicians
Math rock groups
Musical groups established in 2014
Musical trios
Tiny Engines artists